Line 1 of the Lanzhou Metro is a subway line in Lanzhou running from  to , has 20 stations and is  long. It opened on 23 June 2019.

History
Line 1 started construction on July 9, 2012. The line is completely underground. Line 1 opened on 23 June 2019. The operating speed will be . The stations are fitted with platform screen doors. The first two metro lines in Lanzhou will cost about 23 billion yuan ($3.6 billion) and be completed by 2020.

On 22 October 2015, a fire broke out at the construction site of Donggang station. No casualties were reported by authorities.

The China Association of Metros (CAMET) has awarded an innovation award for the techniques used for the tunnel sections of Line 1's first phase under the Yellow River. Line 1 is the first subway in China to tunnel under the Yellow River.

Opening timeline

Stations

Operation
The line averaged 230,800 passengers daily during October 2020, with the busiest station being North Square of Lanzhou West Railway Station followed by Xiguan and Lanzhou University.

Fares
The fare price is distance based as following:

Service
Trains run between 6:30 until 22:00. The travel time between the two termini is roughly 45 minutes.
It is understood that the initial operation time of Line 1 is from 6:30 to 22:00, and the daily operation service is 15 hours and 30 minutes.

References

01
Rail transport in Gansu
Railway lines opened in 2019
2019 establishments in China